Amaiur Sarriegi Isasa (born 13 December 2000) is a Spanish professional footballer who plays as a forward for Real Sociedad and the Spain national team. She is currently one of Real Sociedad's captains.

Club career
In the 2019–20 Segunda División, Sarriegi represented Athletic B and finished the season with 13 goals, therefore making her the team's top goalscorer as they won the second division. The following season, she joined hometown club Real Sociedad and finished the 2020–21 Primera División season with 13 goals.

Sarriegi was named as one of Real Sociedad's captains for the 2021–22 season.

International career
Sarriegi made her debut for the Spain national team on 10 June 2021, coming on as a substitute for Marta Cardona against Belgium.

On 16 September 2021, in her first start for Spain, Sarriegi scored 4 goals in a 2023 FIFA Women's World Cup qualifying match against the Faroe Islands.

International goals

Personal life
Her older brothers Imanol and Oier are also footballers, mainly in Spain's lower divisions.

References

External links

2000 births
Living people
Women's association football forwards
Spanish women's footballers
Spain women's international footballers
Footballers from San Sebastián
Añorga KKE players
Real Sociedad (women) players
Athletic Club Femenino players
Athletic Club Femenino B players
UEFA Women's Euro 2022 players